Süleyman Demirel University (SDU) is a public university located in Isparta, Turkey. Established in 1992, the university, with around 70.000 students, is the second largest academic institution in Turkey. SDU is known for its programs in agricultural research, medicine, engineering, and business sciences. The university (Institution Code: TR ISPARTA01) is approved by the Erasmus programme for participation and funding. SDU is a member of European University Association.

History

SDU was founded on 11 July 1992 in Isparta. The university is named after Suleyman Demirel. The faculty of Engineering and Architecture is the first faculty in the university which was formerly known as Isparta State Engineering and Architecture Academy founded in 1976.

Academic structure

The academic structure of SDU contains fifteen faculties, twelve vocational high schools, two higher schools, and four graduate schools.

Faculties 

The list of faculties in the university:

 Faculty of Fine Arts
 Faculty of Aquatic Products
 Faculty of Arts and Sciences
 Faculty of Dentistry
 Faculty of Theology
 Faculty of Economic and Administrative Sciences
 Faculty of Engineering 
 Faculty of Architecture
 Faculty of Forestry
 Faculty of Technical Education
 Faculty of Medicine
 Faculty of Agriculture
 Faculty of Health Sciences
 Faculty of Technological development
 Faculty of Law
 Faculty of Education

Rankings 

Süleyman Demirel University ranks 10th in Turkey in the 2014-2015 URAP ranking. Additionally, U.S. News & World Report ranks Süleyman Demirel University 14th in the Best Global Universities in Turkey rankings. The QS World University Rankings  recognized Süleyman Demirel University as one of the top universities in Turkey.

Research

The SDU aims to be a research-oriented university, according to its strategic plan. 29 research and implementation centres are operating in scientific and technological areas and form the basis for the implementation of this strategic goal.

SDU's priority research areas cover environmental sciences, biotechnology, energy and technology sciences.

Research centers

SDU Research Hospital
SDU Rose Research Center
Principles of Atatürk and History of the Turkish Revolution Research and Implementation Center
Computer Sciences Research and Implementation Center
Botanic Field and Herbarium Research and Implementation Center
CAD/CAM Implementation Center
Experimental and Observatory Student Research and Implementation Center
Earthquake and Geotechnics Research and Implementation Center
Research and Implementation Center for Geothermal Energy
Groundwater and Mineral Resources Research and Implementation Center
Cancer Early Diagnosis Center
Women Studies Research and Implementation Center
Fashion Design & Ready-made Clothes Research and Implementation Center
Music Culture Research and Implementation Center
Pumice Research and Implementation Center
Radio TV Research and Implementation Center
Ceramics Research and Implementation Center
Center for Strategic Research
Turkish Language Research and Implementation Center
Remote Sensing Research and Implementation Center
Renewable Energy Resources Center for Research and Application
Research and Implementation Hotels
Continuous Education Research and Implementation Center
EU Documentation Research and Implementation Center
Agricultural Research and Implementation Center
Technological Materials Research and Development and Calibration Center

Campus

The SDU's main campus is located in, and occupies most of, the Çünür suburb of Isparta. The university has 300000 square meters built area in 10000 decare land.  Most of the university's centers and faculties are on campus.

Prof. Dr. Hassan Gürbüz Information Centre

Information centre (IC) occupies 8000 square meters and has 950-seat capacity.

IC academic collection consists of  100000 books, 64500 e-books, 1310 journal subscriptions, 39000 e-journal subscriptions, 2500 CD-DVDs and 53 online databases.

Practice and research hospital 

The 400-bed capacity SDU Research Hospital was established on November 1, 2000.

Lakes District Technocity 

The technocity is a science park project. It is located on both east and west campuses.

Lakes District Technocity is a member of International Association of Science Parks.

Student life 

The city of Isparta offers somewhat limited entertainment options, so students spend their free time participating in on-campus activities and in neighbor city Antalya.

Süleyman Demirel University's on-campus housing includes several dormitories.

Every year, the university hosts a spring festival in May and an international jazz festival in December.

Scholarships and financial support

SDU offers several scholarships to students. 750 students receive food scholarship annually from the university. In addition to that, 219 students receive cash scholarship by the General Directorate of Credits and Dormitories.

There is a university-run part-time work system which offers four hours of work per week during academic semesters to eligible students.

Sports and recreation 

The main campus has a sports hall, a football pitch, two artificial grass football pitches, a beach volleyball  court, six tennis courts (four open and two indoor), mini golf fields, an athletics track, a running track, a fitness centre and two open basketball courts.

The 2500-seat sport hall's facilities include an aerobics and steps hall, a gymnastics hall, a squash court, an artificial climbing wall, individual sports halls, a cafeteria, a university merchandise store, and massage and sauna rooms.

SDU has a horse riding club with free membership for students.

Broadcasting

SDU has two student broadcasting operations: SDU Radio and ScienceTV. SDU Radio Television Research and Implementation Center oversees the operations of student broadcasting.

Student clubs 

SDU has 64 student clubs, including: Rock Community, Industrial and Quality Club, Aviation Club, Turkish Folklore Club, Theatre Club, Radio Club, Mountaineering and Orienteering Club, Chess and Bridge Club, Skiing Club, Technology Club, Diving Club, Dance Club, Economics and Management Club, Book Club, Biology and Environment Club.

Honorary doctorates 
Honorary doctorates from Süleyman Demirel University include:

Filiz Akın, actress
Heydar Aliyev, former president of Azerbaijan
Jerzy Buzek, former prime minister of Poland
Rauf Denktaş, first president of Turkish Republic of Northern Cyprus
Fatma Girik, actress
Hülya Koçyiğit, actress
Justin A. McCarthy, U.S. historian
İsmet Sezgin, former speaker of the Turkish parliament
Türkan Şoray, actress
Şarık Tara, businessman in construction
Selçuk Yaşar, businessman in food industry
Andrew Mango, author, historian
Pier Ugo Calzolari, engineer

Notable faculty members
Murat Ali Dulupçu

Partner universities 

  Azerbaijan State University, Azerbaijan
  University of Ghent, Belgium
  Sofia University, Bulgaria
  Tianjin Polytechnic University, China
  Helsinki University, Finland
  Tampere University of Technology, Finland
  Grenoble École de Management, France
  Paris-Sud 11 University, France
  Berlin Technical University, Germany
  Free University of Berlin, Germany
  University of Ferrara, Italy
  University of Parma, Italy
  University of Pisa, Italy
  University of Florence, Italy
  University of L'Aquila, Italy
  Erasmus University Rotterdam, Netherlands
  Wageningen University, Netherlands
  Lodz University, Poland
  University of Warsaw, Poland
  University of Ljubljana, Slovenia
  University of Valencia, Spain
  University of Barcelona, Spain
  University of Salamanca, Spain
  Ching Yun University, Taiwan
  Ohio State University, United States
  Iowa State University, United States

See also
 Balkan Universities Network
 List of forestry universities and colleges

References

External links 
 
 Suleyman Demirel University Information Center
 Suleyman Demirel University Electronic Journals
 Suleyman Demirel University Open Archives Harvester
 Suleyman Demirel University Information Center Blog

 
Educational institutions established in 1992
1992 establishments in Turkey
Buildings and structures in Isparta Province
Forestry education
Forestry in Turkey
Isparta